Kyzylkungei Hydroelectric Power Plant is a hydroelectric power planton the Koksu River in Rudnichny village, Koksu District, in Almaty Province, Kazakhstan.

References
Kaz-business.com

External links

Hydroelectric power stations in Kazakhstan